Hazeley Pyle (born 7 October 1993) is an Antiguan former footballer who played as a defender,

Career

Pyle started his career with American third tier side Antigua Barracuda, where he made 25 league appearances and scored 1 goal. On 1 July 2012, he debuted for Antigua Barracuda during a 1–0 win over Charleston Battery. On 5 May 2013, Pyle scored his first goal for Antigua Barracuda during a 2–7 loss to Orlando City SC. 

Before the 2015 season, he joined John Brown Golden Eagles in the United States. Before the 2017 season, Pyle signed for American fourth tier club Charlotte Eagles, helping them win the league.

References

External links

  

1993 births
Antigua and Barbuda expatriate footballers
Antigua and Barbuda expatriate sportspeople in the United States
Antigua and Barbuda footballers
Antigua Barracuda F.C. players
Association football defenders
Charlotte Eagles players
Expatriate soccer players in the United States
John Brown Golden Eagles men's soccer players 
Living people
National Premier Soccer League players
USL League One players
USL League Two players